Aglossosia deceptans is a moth of the subfamily Arctiinae first described by George Hampson in 1914. It is found in the Republic of the Congo, the Democratic Republic of the Congo and Kenya.

References

Moths described in 1914
Lithosiini
Moths of Africa